USS Green Dragon (SP-742) was a United States Navy patrol vessel commissioned in 1917 that served during World War I.

Green Dragon was built in 1901 as a private motorboat of the same name by J. Smith at Port Washington on Long Island, New York. On 19 July 1917, the U.S. Navy acquired her from her owner, Edward German of Newport, Rhode Island, for use as a section patrol vessel during World War I. She was commissioned as USS Green Dragon (SP-742) in 1917.

Assigned to the 2nd Naval District in southern New England, Green Dragon patrolled the coast of the United States from Chatham, Massachusetts, to New London, Connecticut, for the rest of World War I.

Green Dragon was sold to George E. Clement & Son of Philadelphia, Pennsylvania, on 25 February 1922.

References

SP-742 Green Dragon at Department of the Navy Naval History and Heritage Command Online Library of Selected Images: U.S. Navy Ships -- Listed by Hull Number "SP" #s and "ID" #s -- World War I Era Patrol Vessels and other Acquired Ships and Craft numbered from SP-700 through SP-799
NavSource Online: Section Patrol Craft Photo Archive Green Dragon (SP 742)

Patrol vessels of the United States Navy
World War I patrol vessels of the United States
Ships built in New York (state)
1901 ships